Jennie C. Jones (born 1968 in Cincinnati, Ohio) is an African-American artist living and working in Brooklyn, New York. Her work has been described, by Ken Johnson, as evoking minimalism, and paying tribute to the cross-pollination of different genres of music, especially jazz. As an artist, she connects most of her work between art and sound. Such connections are made with multiple mediums, from paintings to sculptures and paper to audio collages. In 2012, Jones was the recipient of the Joyce Alexander Wien Prize, one of the biggest awards given to an individual artist in the United States. The prize honors one African-American artist who has proven their commitment to innovation and creativity, with an award of 50,000 dollars.
In December 2015 a 10-year survey of Jones's work, titled Compilation, opened at the Contemporary Arts Museum in Houston, Texas.

Education
Jennie C. Jones received her BFA at The School of the Art Institute of Chicago, in 1991. She then graduated from Mason Gross School of the Arts at Rutgers University, earning her MFA in 1996. In the summer of 1996, Jones was a participant at Skowhegan School of Painting and Sculpture.

Career
Jones is a visual and sonic artist whose paintings, sculptures, and works on paper incorporate ideas around minimalism, abstraction, Jazz, and Black history. Valerie Cassel Oliver noted in her “Outside The Lines,” catalogue essay, that “working in painting as well as sound, she has mined the politics, culture and aesthetic innovations of the mid-20th century and has emerged with sharp criticisms and astute queries that are now embedded in the work. Jones's work challenges us to understand the frameworks of modernism, which embraced black musical forms but excluded black visual art from its canon". During Absorb / Diffuse, her fall 2011 exhibition at The Kitchen in New York City, Jones presented a piece titled From The Low, which is a sound piece that has multiple music samples, ranging from jazz to modern electronica. From The Low presents her political statement: that African-American artists and musicians are absent from modernism. The samples used in this sound piece have been "given a new context, perhaps to be classified in a category of black minimalism".

The audio pieces are constructed using traditional sound editing methodologies and often have their origin in historic recordings. With the amalgamation of industrial acoustic materials, often used in recording studios and listening rooms, Jones's art focuses on building a bridge between two-dimensional works, architecture, and sound. Jennie has stated that "conceptualism allows these different media to occupy the same space.” Jones is a critic in the Sculpture Department at Yale University.

Works

2000s – early work 
In Jones's 'Selected Early Works,' she combined photography, visual arts, and audio art. Jones's website displays 30 images of her work completed in the 2000s. These works not only includes static, lasting art but also records of her installation art, such as her 2003 A/V Sound Work installation. These works, along with the works that follow, are easily accessible on her artist website.  Towards the end of the early years of Jones work she received the William H. Johnson Prize in 2008.  This is a $25,000 award given to African American artists based in the Los Angeles area.

2009 – Atlanta 
This installation was a collection of visual works of acrylic painting, ink and collage works among other mediums. Jones's "Atlanta" exhibit at the Atlanta Contemporary Art Center.

2010 – Electric 
This collection is a variety of 2-D and 3-D works exhibited at Sikkema, Jenkins & Co. Gallery during July 8 - August 13, 2010.

2011 – Absorb, Silence 
This installation at the Yerba Buena Center for the Arts in San Francisco, California was a combination of acrylic paintings, installation art, and various other 3-D art works.

2012 – Harmonic Disruption 
This exhibit was a collection of ink works on paper and installations of cable and speakers located in the Arratia Beer gallery in Berlin, Germany.

2013 – Higher Resonance 
At the Hirshhorn Museum and Sculpture Gallery in Washington, D.C., this exhibit contained works of acrylic paint, wood, fiberglass, mineral wool filling, and fabric.

2014 – Tone 
In a combination of acrylic paint on canvas and acoustic absorber panel, noise cancelling cable, and mixed media collage, Jones's Tone was displayed at Sikkema, Jenkins & Co. Gallery.

2015 – Group 
This exhibition was a group collection at the Sikkema, Jenkins & Co. Gallery. Jones, along with Josephine Halvorson and Leslie Hewitt displayed works of paintings and photography during 12/11/15 - 1/28/16.

2016 – Compilation 
This installation at The Contemporary Art Museum, Houston, Texas, was on display from December 11, 2015 - March 27, 2016 and combined 2D art and 3D art.

2017 – Amplitude 
This installation included both paint on canvas and acoustic soundboard. The Sikkema, Jenkins & Co. Gallery had this to say about Jones's Amplitude: "Jennie C. Jones' work exposes the connections between conceptual and avant-garde African-American music and the cultural, political, and historical ideas surrounding Minimalism and Abstraction. Jones brings to light the unlikely alliances that emerged between the visual arts and the imprint of music, highlighting the way they became and continue to exist as tangible markers of social evolution and political strivings."

2018 – Alternative Takes 
This installation was at the Patron Gallery, Chicago, Illinois from February 3 - March 18, 2018.  It combined acrylic paint and 3D art.

2018 – RPM (Revolutions Per Minute) 
This installation brings together audio collages and works on paper.  It was displayed at The Glass House, New Canaan, Connecticut from September 2018 - January 2019.

Exhibitions
Jones's work has been exhibited all over the world. One of her first notable New York City group shows was "Freestyle" at the Studio Museum in Harlem, a show that included artists such as Sanford Biggers, Mark Bradford, Julie Mehretu, and Rashid Johnson.

Jones is represented by Alexander Gray Associates and Patron Gallery.

Selected solo exhibitions
Jennie C. Jones: Dynamics, Solomon R. Guggenheim Museum, New York, New York, February 4, 2022-May 2, 2022
Jennie C. Jones: Constant Structure, The Arts Club of Chicago, Chicago, Illinois, 2020
Jennie C. Jones: RPM (revolutions per minute), The Glass House, New Canaan, Connecticut, 2018
alternate takes, PATRON, Chicago, Illinois, 2018
Jennie C. Jones: Compilation, Contemporary Arts Museum Houston, TX 2015-2016
Tone, Sikkema Jenkins Co., New York City, New York 2014
Higher Resonance, Hirshhorn Museum and Sculpture Garden, Washington, D.C. 2013
Jennie C. Jones: Counterpoint, Yerba Beuna Center for the Arts, San Francisco, California 2011
Absorb/Diffuse, The Kitchen, New York City, New York, 2011
Song Containers & Objects, Lawrimore Projects, Seattle, Washington 2010
Electric, Sikkema, Jenkins & Co., New York, New York 2010
 The Walkman Compositions,  Smack Mellon Gallery, New York City, New York 2009
RED, BIRD, BLUE, Atlanta Contemporary Art Center, Atlanta, Georgia 2009
Jones: Recomposing, Arratia Beer Gallery, Berlin, Germany, 2007
Simply Because You're Near Me, Artists Space, Project Room, New York, New York 2006
Harlem/Haarlem, Begane Grond Kunstcentrum, Utrecht, The Netherlands, 2000

Selected group exhibitions
Prospect.5, New Orleans Contemporary Art Triennial, New Orleans, Louisiana, 2020 (postponed to Fall 2021)
Ground Work, The Clark, Williamstown, Massachusetts, 2020
Riffs and Relations: African American Artists and the European Modernist Tradition, The Phillips Collection, New York, New York 2020
Sounds Lasting and Leaving, Luxembourg & Dayan, New York, New York, 2020
The Shape of Shape, The Museum of Modern Art, New York, New York, 2019
OR BOTH, Moore College of Art and Design, Philadelphia, Pennsylvania, 2019
Generations: A History of Black Abstract Art, Baltimore Museum of Art, Baltimore, Maryland
Double Edged: Geometric Abstraction Then and Now, The Bob & Lissa Shelley McDowell Gallery, Weatherspoon Art Museum, Greensboro, North Carolina 2019
Out of Easy Reach, DePaul Art Museum, Chicago, Illinois; Grunwald Gallery of Art, Indiana University, Bloomington, Illinois, 2018
Spin: Turning Records Into Art, Kentucky Museum of Art and Craft, Louisville, Kentucky 2018
Solidary and Solitary: The Pamela J. Joyner and Alfred J. Giuffrida Collection, Nasher Museum of Art, Duke University, Durham, North Carolina; Snite Museum of Art, University of Notre Dame, Notre Dame, Indiana 2018
Magnetic Fields: Expanding American Abstraction, 1960s to Today, Kemper Museum of Contemporary Art, Kansas City, Missouri; Travels to: National Museum of Women in the Arts, Washington, D.C., 2017
Power, Spruth Magers, Los Angeles, California, 2017
Gray Matters, Wexner Center for the Arts, Columbus, Ohio, 2017
Black & Blue, The Pulitzer Foundation, St. Louis, 2017
Solidary and Solitary: The Pamela J. Joyner and Alfred J. Giuffrida Collection, Ogden Museum of Southern Art, New Orleans, Louisiana; Travels to: Nasher Museum of Art at Duke University, Durham, North Carolina; Snite Museum of Art at the University of Notre Dame, Notre Dame, Indiana; The Smart Museum of Art at the University of Chicago, Chicago, Illinois; Baltimore Museum of Art, Baltimore, Maryland; Berkeley Art Museum, Berkeley, California; Perez Art Museum Miami, Miami, Florida, 2017
Artists of Color, The Underground Museum, Los Angeles, California, 2017
Cells, Marianne Boesky Gallery, New York, New York, 2017
Cut-Up, Franklin Street Works, Stamford, Connecticut, 2016
From Minimalism into Algorithm, The Kitchen, New York, New York, 2016
James Baldwin/Jim Brown and the Children, The Artist's Institute, New York, New York, 2016
Variations: Conversations in and Around Abstract Painting, Los Angeles County Museum of Art, Los Angeles, California 2014-2015
Outside the Lines: Black in the Abstract, Part 2, Contemporary Arts Museum Houston, Houston, Texas 2014
Roughneck Constructivists curated by Kara Walker at the ICA in Philadelphia, Pennsylvania 2014
SILENCE a survey exhibition curated by Toby Kamps, The Menil Collection, Houston, Texas 2012
With Hidden Noise a group exhibition curated by Stephen Vitiello, Aspen Art Museum, Aspen, Colorado 2011
30 Seconds off an Inch, The Studio Museum in Harlem, New York, New York 2010
This-Has-Been, On Stellar Rays, Gallery 133, New York, New York 2009
(Dis)Concert, Steve Turner Contemporary, Los Angeles, California 2008
Black Light, White Noise: Sound & Light in Contemporary Art, Contemporary Arts Museum Houston, Houston, Texas 2007
Pa*per*ing, Deutsch Bank, New York City, New York 2006
Double Consciousness: Black Conceptual Art Since 1970, Houston Contemporary Art Museum, Houston, Texas 2005
Freestyle, Santa Monica Museum of Art, Santa Monica, California 2001
Freestyle, The Studio Museum of Harlem, New York City, New York 2001
Current/Undercurrent, Brooklyn Museum, 1997

Fellowships and residencies
Rauschenberg Residency, Captiva Florida 2014
The Lower East Side Printshop – Special Editions Resident, 2011
Rockefeller Foundation Bellagio Study Center – Italy, March 2008
American Academy in Rome, Italy, Visiting Artist - April 2008
Liguria Study Center for the Arts & Humanities Fellow – Genova, Italy, 2004
Cité internationale des arts in Paris, 2002–03
Lower Manhattan Cultural Council Residency World Trade Center, 1999
Skowhegan School of Painting and Sculpture (1996)

Awards
Robert Rauschenberg Award, Foundation for Contemporary Arts, 2016
Joan Mitchell Award Grantee, 2013
The Joyce Alexander Wein Prize, 2012
Art Matters Grant, 2012
William H. Johnson Prize, 2008
Creative Capital Grantee, 2008
Pollock-Krasner Grant Recipient, 2000

Collections
BNY Mellon, Pittsburgh, Pennsylvania
Deutsche Bank, New York, New York
Solomon R. Guggenheim Museum, New York, New York
Mott-Warsh Collection, Flint, Michigan
The Hirshhorn Museum and Sculpture Garden, Smithsonian Institution, Washington, D.C.
The Zimmerli Museum, Rutgers University, New Jersey
The Studio Museum in Harlem, New York City, New York
Los Angeles County Museum of Art (LACMA), Los Angeles, California
The Americas Collection, Deutsche Bank
Weil, Gotshal & Manges, New York City, New York
Museum of Modern Art, New York, New York

References

External links
Art in America Review for Absorb/Diffuse at The Kitchen 2011
Ken Johnson's review of Electric at Sikkema Jenkins and Company 2010
Holland Cotter's review of Simply Because You're Near Me at Artists Space 2006
Holland Cotter's review of Freestyle at the Studio Museum in Harlem 2001
National Endowment for the Arts Interview Podcast
Jennie C. Jones: On Jazz and Art interview on Sound Check with John Schaefer 2013
Listen to Harmonic Distortion
Listen to Cassette Mixing with Elvin and Flute

1968 births
Living people
American women artists
African-American contemporary artists
American contemporary artists
Artists from Cincinnati
Mason Gross School of the Arts alumni
School of the Art Institute of Chicago alumni
Skowhegan School of Painting and Sculpture alumni
21st-century African-American people
21st-century African-American women
20th-century African-American people
20th-century African-American women